Miranda Green is a British journalist, and the former Press Secretary to then Liberal Democrats party leader Paddy Ashdown.

Education
Green went to Westminster School before studying English at Jesus College, Cambridge.

Career
After graduation, she worked as a business journalist for two years, including a traineeship at EuroWeek magazine. She then joined the Liberal Democrats in their press team, becoming in 1997 press secretary and advisor to the party's leader Paddy Ashdown.

After Ashdown stepped down as leader in August 1999, Green joined the BBC for a short time to work on On The Record with John Humphrys, then became a journalist and columnist at the Financial Times. Employed first on the home news desk, she was then deputy world news editor, then the paper's education correspondent, and finally political correspondent.

After giving birth to her first child in 2009, she has since been freelance, working for The Times, The Observer, The Sunday Times and Intelligent Life. She has also appeared as a pundit and commentator on The World Tonight (BBC Radio 4), Newshour (BBC World Service), The Politics Show, This Week (both on BBC One) and Newsnight (BBC Two), alongside appearances on BBC Radio 5Live, LBC and BSkyB.

Green was editor at The Day, a news website for schoolchildren, founded at the beginning of 2011 by Richard Addis.

References

British women journalists
Financial Times people
Liberal Democrats (UK) officials
Living people
People educated at Westminster School, London
Year of birth missing (living people)